is a 2016 Japanese action film directed by Toru Murakawa, written by Hiroshi Kashiwabara and starring Hiroshi Tachi and Kyōhei Shibata. The film is part of the film series based on the Abunai Deka television series. It was released in Japan on January 30, 2016.

Cast
Hiroshi Tachi as Toshiki Takayama
Kyōhei Shibata as Yuji Oshita
Atsuko Asano as Kaoru Mayama
Tōru Nakamura as Tōru Machida
Nana Kinomi as Yuko Matsumura
Nenji Kobayashi as Shinzo Fukamachi
Bengaru as Fumio Tanaka
Michihiro Yamanishi as Yoshizawa
Junko Miyashita as Mis.Yoshizawa
Ryuji Katagiri as Ryuji Okunishi
Nanao as Natsumi Hamabe
Kōji Kikkawa as Koichi Garcia

Reception
The film grossed  on its opening weekend, with 217,273 admissions.

References

External links 
 
 

2010s Japanese films
Japanese action films
2016 action films
Films based on television series